Heinz Kubsch (20 July 1930, Essen –  24 October 1993) was a German football goalkeeper.

He was part of the West German team that won the 1954 FIFA World Cup. In total he earned three caps for West Germany. During his club career he played for FK Pirmasens.

During the 1954 FIFA World Cup, Kubsch almost became the starter of the German team. The standard goalkeeper Toni Turek had shown some weaknesses in the first game against Turkey and the second goalkeeper Heinrich Kwiatkowski had conceded eight goals in the game against Hungary, which made Sepp Herberger consider giving Kubsch a chance in the second game against Turkey. However Kubsch got injured between matchdays after a boat trip. Kubsch stumbled badly and injured his shoulder on a concrete staircase, which impeded any chance of Kubsch getting a chance to start.

As a goalkeeper, Kubsch was very agile and showed fast reactions on the goalline. When he debuted in 1948 at the age of 17, he became the youngest goalkeeper in the Oberliga. He ended his career in April 1961 after having played in 222 Oberliga games.

References

1930 births
1993 deaths
Footballers from Essen
German footballers
Germany international footballers
Association football goalkeepers
1954 FIFA World Cup players
FIFA World Cup-winning players
FK Pirmasens players